The Canadian University Field Lacrosse Association (CUFLA) is an association of men's field lacrosse teams connected with several universities in Ontario and Quebec. Teams compete in the fall with league playoffs typically in early November.

History 
Founded in 1985, the Canadian University Field Lacrosse Association, or the "CUFLA," was originally known as the Ontario University Field Lacrosse Association (OUFLA) and, as the name suggests, was entirely Ontario-based. Throughout the 1980s and 1990s, OUFLA expanded to include more teams across Ontario.

Having grown to 10 teams in 2002, OUFLA changed its name to the Canadian University Field Lacrosse Association to reflect the additions of McGill University and Bishop's University, both located in Quebec.

The league expanded to 12 teams in 2007 with the additions of Trent (Peterborough) and Laurentian (Sudbury) universities. With these additions the league split into two divisions (east and west) based on geographic location of member schools.

Concordia University in Montreal became the 13th member, the third in Quebec, in 2012.

As it celebrates its 30th year in 2014, the CUFLA has expanded again to 15 teams with the addition of Nipissing University and the University of Ottawa. This ongoing growth bodes well for the continued expansion of men's field lacrosse at various universities across Canada.

Concordia University left after the 2015 season, leaving the league with 14 teams.

Teams 

Former
 Concordia University – Montreal, Quebec
 Waterloo Warriors – Waterloo, Ontario
 Windsor Lancers – Windsor, Ontario
 York Yeomen – Toronto, Ontario

Champions 
The Baggataway Cup is the Canadian university field lacrosse championship, awarded annually to the winner of the post-season tournament by the Canadian University Field Lacrosse Association. The Baggataway Cup tournament is typically held the second weekend in November, and is hosted by one of the member schools.

Executive 

The operations of CUFLA are handled by an executive that reports regularly to the team presidents, typically at annual general meetings. Currently, the executive is composed of a commissioner, 2 assistant commissioners, a treasurer, a director of communications, a high school liaison and a referee-in-chief.

 Kevin Caplice - Commissioner
 Chris Lesanko - Asst. Commissioner
 Brandon McLean - Asst. Commissioner
 Mark Walker - Treasurer
 Ian Garrison - Referee in Chief
 Stephen Stamp - Director of Communications
 Jim Price - High School Liaison

Player eligibility 
Only current students registered at their respective universities with a full course load are deemed eligible to play in CUFLA competitions. Players who have played professional field lacrosse (such as Major League Lacrosse) are prohibited from playing in CUFLA.

However, players who play professional box lacrosse (such as the National Lacrosse League) are eligible to play. Throughout the years, the league has seen many current and former NLL players scattered throughout various teams.

Alumni 
Many current and former players have met with a great deal of success representing their countries or playing professional lacrosse in the National Lacrosse League and Major League Lacrosse.

Media coverage 
Media coverage of CUFLA has grown in recent years, with local and student newspapers devoting several articles to CUFLA's game results. Several lacrosse websites (Lacrosse All Stars, Inside Lacrosse, The Lacrosse News,Lacrosse Bucket , etc.) and magazines have taken notice and included CUFLA in their ongoing coverage of the world of lacrosse.

References

External links
 Canadian University Field Lacrosse Association

Lacrosse governing bodies of Canada
1985 establishments in Canada
Sports leagues established in 1985
Lacrosse leagues in Canada